Dorothy Collins can refer to

Dorothy Collins (1926–1994), an American actress and recording artist (born Marjorie Chandler)
Dottie Wiltse Collins (1923–2008), an American professional baseball player
Dolly Collins (1933–1995) English folk musician, arranger and composer.

See also
 Collins (surname)